The second season of Numbers, an American television series, premiered on September 23, 2005 and its season finale was on May 19, 2006. Season two sees several changes to Don's FBI team: Terry Lake is reassigned to Washington DC and two new members join Don and David Sinclair: Megan Reeves and Colby Granger. Charlie is challenged on one of his long-standing pieces of mathematical work and also starts work on a new theory, Cognitive Emergence Theory. Larry sells his home and lives a nomadic lifestyle, while he becomes romantically involved with Megan. Amita receives an offer for an assistant professor position at Harvard University, but is plagued by doubt as her relationship with Charlie is challenged and her career is in upheaval. Alan begins working and dating again, though he struggles with the loss of his wife.

Cast

Main 
 Rob Morrow as Don Eppes
 David Krumholtz as Charlie Eppes
 Judd Hirsch as Alan Eppes
 Alimi Ballard as David Sinclair
 Navi Rawat as Amita Ramanujan
 Diane Farr as Megan Reeves
 Peter MacNicol as Larry Fleinhardt

Recurring 
 Dylan Bruno as Colby Granger
 Lou Diamond Phillips as Ian Edgerton
 Sarah Carter as Nadine Hodges
 Colin Hanks as Marshall Penfield
 Michelle Nolden as Robin Brooks
 Will Patton as Detective Gary Walker

Guest

Episodes

References
NOTE: Refs Need Archive Backup URLs @ https://archive.org/web/

External links 
 

2
2005 American television seasons
2
2006 American television seasons